Proto-Sino-Tibetan (PST) is the reconstructed proto-language of the Sino-Tibetan language family and the common ancestor of all languages in it, most prominently the Chinese languages, the Tibetan language, Yi, Bai, Burmese, Karen, Tangut, and Naga. Paul K. Benedict (1972) placed a particular emphasis on Old Chinese, Classical Tibetan, Jingpho, Written Burmese, Garo, and Mizo in his discussion of Proto-Sino-Tibetan.

Proto-Tibeto-Burman may be considered as equivalent to Proto-Sino-Tibetan if Sinitic is considered to be a lower-order subgroup within the Tibeto-Burman group.

Features
Reconstructed features include prefixes such as the causative s-, the intransitive m-, the miscellaneous b-, d-, g-, and r-, suffixes -s, -t, and -n, and a set of conditioning factors that resulted in the development of tone in most languages of the family. The existence of such elaborate system of inflectional changes in Proto-Sino-Tibetan makes the language distinctive from some of its modern descendants, such as the Sinitic languages, which have mostly or completely become analytic.

Proto-Sino-Tibetan, like Old Chinese, also included numerous consonant clusters, and was not a tonal language.

Phonology

Benedict (1972)
The table below shows consonant phonemes reconstructed by Benedict (1972).

Peiros & Starostin (1996)
The reconstruction by Peiros & Starostin suggests a much more complex consonant inventory. The phonemes in brackets are reconstructions that are considered dubious.

Sound changes

Final consonant changes
The finals *-p, *-t, *-k, *-m, *-n, and *-ŋ in Proto-Sino-Tibetan remained in Proto-Sinitic and Proto-Tibeto-Burman. However, in Old Chinese, the finals *-k and *-ŋ that came after the close vowel *-i- underwent an irregular change of *-k＞*-t and *-ŋ ＞*-n. In Proto-Tibeto-Burman, *-kw and *-ŋw underwent a sound change to become *-k and *-ŋ respectively, while in Old Chinese those finals remained until Middle Chinese, where the finals underwent the same sound change.

Furthermore, in Proto-Tibeto-Burman, the finals *-g, *-gw, and *-d underwent the following changes:
 *-d＞*-y
 *-gw＞*-w
 *-g＞*-w when it follows the vowel *-u-
 *-g＞*-∅ when it follows the vowel *a and *-a-.

Example of sound changes

Voiceless plosive finals

Nasal finals

Voiced plosive finals

Liquid finals

Vocabulary
Words which do not have reliable Sinitic parallels are accompanied by a (TB).

Social terms

Natural phenomena

Qualitative features of an object

Verb stems

Numbers

See also
Proto-Tibeto-Burman language

References

Sino-Tibetan languages
Sino-Tibetan